Injinoo (formerly Cowal Creek) is a coastal town in the Northern Peninsula Area Region and a locality split between Northern Peninsula Area Region and the Shire of Torres in Far North Queensland, Australia. It is on the north-western coast of Cape York Peninsula.

History
Luthigh (also known as Lotiga, Tepiti and Uradhi, see also Uradhi related languages) is an Australian Aboriginal language spoken by the Luthigh people. The traditional language area for Luthigh includes landscape within the local government boundaries of the Cook Shire: Eastern Cape York, Ducie River, Northern Peninsula, New Mapoon, Injinoo, and Cowal Creek.

Uradhi (also known as Anggamudi, Ankamuti, Atampaya, Bawtjathi, and Lotiga) is an Australian Aboriginal language of the Western Cape York Peninsula. The traditional language region includes north of Mapoon and Duyfken Point and east of the coast strip to the north of Port Musgrave (Angkamuthi country) incorporating the mouth of the Ducie River, the lower reaches of the Dulhunty River and the upper reaches of the Skardon River in the north. Following the displacement of Indigenous people by British settlement, it was also spoken in the Northern Peninsula Area Region including the communities of New Mapoon, Injinoo and Cowal Creek.

Injinoo Aboriginal Community was an Aboriginal settlement and later Anglican mission established on Cape York by a community led by a Wuthathi man, Allelic Whitesand.

Although self-sufficient, through fishing and gardening, the Community made requests to the then Church of England to establish a mission and school. Queensland government officials allowed the community to function through an elected Council.

After the Second World War, which saw a considerable military presence in the area, many Torres Strait Islanders began moving into Injinoo. Settlements were subsequently built at Bamaga, New Mapoon and Umagico to relocate evicted people from this and other areas of the Cape. In 1948 a reserve was created, with control of the area having been taken over by the Queensland Department of Native Affairs.

The official name of the community was changed from Cowal Creek to Injinoo  on 2 September 1989.

Facilities 
In 2012, the Indigenous Knowledge Centre was opened at Injinoo, operated by the Northern Peninsula Area Regional Council. It has produced a video detailing traditional bush foods as part of a children's language workshop.

References

External links 

Towns in Queensland
Australian Aboriginal missions
Indigenous Australian reserves
Far North Queensland
Aboriginal communities in Queensland
Shire of Torres
Northern Peninsula Area Region
Coastline of Queensland
Localities in Queensland